Tiberkanine is a town and commune in northern Algeria. it is located in the western part of Aïn Defla Province, close to the border with Chlef Province.

Communes of Aïn Defla Province